Parliamentary elections were held in Bulgaria on 28 January 1901. Despite receiving only the third highest number of votes, the Progressive Liberal Party emerged as the largest party in Parliament with 40 of the 164 seats. Voter turnout was 42.7%.

Results

References

Bulgaria
1901 in Bulgaria
Parliamentary elections in Bulgaria
January 1901 events
1901 elections in Bulgaria